Albert Kretschmer (27 February 1825 – 11 July 1891) was a German professor, painter, costumes researcher and chairman of Schauspielhaus Berlin.

Life and work 
Kretschmer moved to Berlin in 1842 and studied under Professor Carl Joseph Begas at the Prussian Academy of Arts. He lived in Friedrichstadt, Behrenstraße 8 and was father of historic geographer Konrad Kretschmer and Indo-European linguist Paul Kretschmer.

Kretschmer was renowned for his detailed drawings, watercolor paintings and lithographs and their appearance in publications on German and international Tracht as well as historic fashion.

Furthermore, Kretschmer worked as a costume designer at Schauspielhaus Berlin until 1889.

Selected works 

 Illustrationen

Gallery

References

Further reading

External links 

 

 

19th-century German painters
German male painters
1825 births
1891 deaths
People from Świdnica
People from the Province of Silesia
19th-century German male artists